The 1991 Bucknell Bison football team was an American football team that represented Bucknell University during the 1991 NCAA Division I-AA football season. Bucknell finished second-to-last in the Patriot League.

In their third year under head coach Lou Maranzana, the Bison compiled a 1–9 record. Brian Henesey and John Spatafore were the team captains.

The Bison were outscored 326 to 99. Bucknell's 1–4 conference record placed fifth in the six-team Patriot League standings.

Bucknell played its home games at Christy Mathewson–Memorial Stadium on the university campus in Lewisburg, Pennsylvania.

Schedule

References

Bucknell
Bucknell Bison football seasons
Bucknell Bison football